Manonga River, also known as Manyonga, is a river in located between Tabora Region and Shinyanga Region, Tanzania. The river flows eastwards into Lake Kitangiri.  During the dry season, from June to November, the Manonga River is completely dry.

References

Rivers of Tanzania
Southern Eastern Rift